The 2015 New Zealand Winter Games was the 4th edition of the New Zealand Winter Gameswas contested August 21 through August 30 in the cities of Naseby, Queenstown, and Wanaka. A total of 35 events across 5 disciplines will be contested, as well as a night parallel slalom to be contested during the opening ceremony. The event is officially called the Audi quattro Wintergames.

Venues
All venues were located within the Otago region of New Zealand. Alpine skiing will be contested within Coronet Peak in Queenstown. Cross country skiing will take place at the Snow Farm in Wanaka. Curling will be held in the Naseby Curling Rink, or the Maniototo Curling International within Naseby. Both freestyle skiing and snowboarding will be held at the Cardrona Alpine Resort near Wanaka.

Sports
Five winter sports will be contested throughout the duration of the games. This is an increase from the total number of events from the 2011 New Zealand Winter Games.

Alpine skiing will be made up of the giant slalom, slalom, IPC giant slalom, and IPC slalom, all of which will feature both men's and women's events for a total of 16. Additionally, a night parallel slalom will be contested on the 21st during the opening ceremonies with the winners receiving $15,000.

Cross-country skiing will include the events of 15 km Mass Start Classic and 10 km Individual Freestyle for men, the 10 km Mass Start Classic and 5 km Individual Freestyle for women, as well as the sprint for both genders. A total of 6 events will be contested within the discipline.

Curling will only feature one event, the curling mixed doubles. It will include a 2-person team made up of one man and one woman. The event was recently added onto the Winter Olympic program, and this will most likely serve as an important testing event for the sport.

Freestyle skiing will feature big air (or aerials) as well as halfpipe and slopestyle. The halfpipe and slopestyle will both be a part of the 2016 Freestyle Skiing World Cup. All events will feature both a male and female version for a total of 6 events.

Snowboarding will include big air, halfpipe, and slopestyle. Big air was also recently added onto the Winter Olympic Program, so this will likely serve as an important test event. The halfpipe and slopestyle events are part of the 2016 Snowboarding World Cup. All events will include a male and female version for a total of 6 events.

Medalists
Men's Alpine Skiing

Women's Alpine Skiing

Men's Cross Country Skiing

Women's Cross Country Skiing

Curling

Men's Freestyle Skiing

Women's Freestyle Skiing

Men's Snowboarding

Women's Snowboarding

Medal table
The United States claimed the most medals by far, winning 10 gold, 9 silver and 6 bronze for a total of 25; 1/4 of the medals in total awarded. In 2nd was South Korea, with 7 gold, 3 silver and 4 bronze for a total of 14. In 3rd was Japan, with 3 gold, 5 silver and 3 bronze for a total of 11. The host nation, New Zealand, finished in 9th with 1 gold and 3 silver. A total of 18 nations took home at least 1 medal, and 15 nations took home at least 1 gold.

References

2015
Winter Games
2015 in winter sports
2015 in multi-sport events
August 2015 sports events in New Zealand